Agyneta spicula is a species of sheet weaver found in the United States. It was described by Duperre in 2013.

References

spicula
Spiders described in 2013
Spiders of the United States